The History of the Northern Dynasties is one of the official Chinese historical works in the Twenty-Four Histories canon. The text contains 100 volumes and covers the period from 386 to 618, the histories of Northern Wei, Western Wei, Eastern Wei, Northern Zhou, Northern Qi, and Sui dynasty. Like the History of the Southern Dynasties, the book was started by Li Dashi and compiled from texts of the Book of Wei and Book of Zhou. Following his death, Li Yanshou (李延寿), son of Li Dashi, completed the work on the book between 643 and 659.  Unlike most of the rest of the Twenty-Four Histories, this work was not commissioned by the state.

Content 
Volumes 1–5 contain the Wei annals including the Eastern Wei and Western Wei emperors. Volumes 6–8 contain the annals of the Northern Qi emperors, volumes 9–10 contain the annals of the Northern Zhou emperors, and volumes 11–12 contain the annals of the Sui emperors. Volumes 13–14 contain the biographies of empresses and consorts. Volumes 15–19 contain biographies  of the imperial families of the Wei dynasties and volumes 20–50 contain the other Wei biographies. Volumes 51-79 contain biographies of figures from the Northern Qi (51–56), Northern Zhou (59–70), and Sui (71–79) dynasties. Volumes 80 through 100 contain other biographical content, including families of imperial consorts (80), Confucian scholars (81-82), literature (83), filial acts (84), recluses (75–76), exemplars of the loyal and righteous (85), virtuous officials (86), cruel officials (87), recluses (88), divination (89–90), exemplary women (91), favorites of nobles (92), foreign states and peoples (93–99), and a preface to the biographies (100).

References

Citations

Works cited

External links 

 Text of the History of the Northern Dynasties, National Sun Yat-sen University
 History of the Northern Dynasties 《北史》 Chinese text with matching English vocabulary

See also 

 Twenty-Four Histories
 History of the Southern Dynasties

Twenty-Four Histories
7th-century history books
Sixteen Kingdoms
Northern Wei
Northern Zhou
Northern Qi
Sui dynasty
History books about the Northern and Southern dynasties
History books about the Sui dynasty
Tang dynasty literature
7th-century Chinese books